Liang Boqi (1918 – December 25, 2013) was the wife of Zhao Ziyang, the third premier of the People's Republic of China from 1980 to 1987, vice chairman of the Chinese Communist Party (CCP) from 1981 to 1982, and CCP general secretary from 1987 to 1989.

In 1918, Liang Boqi was born in Nanzhuang, Chengguan Town, Neihuang County. When she was in middle school, She studied in Kaifeng and Wuhan. After the July 7th Incident in 1937, Liang Boqi dropped out of school and returned to her hometown. In April 1938, she participated in the Anti-Japanese Movement led by the Communist Party of China. "Team" Southern Hebei Sub-division Captain, concurrently serving as the Deputy Director of the Propaganda Department of the Women's Salvation Congress in the Hebei-Shandong-Henan Border Region.

In January 1939, Liang Boqi was sent by the CCP organization to Hua County, Henan Province as the director of the Women's Salvation Congress, thus becoming the first full-time female cadre in the Hua County Committee of the CCP and the Hua County Anti-Japanese Democratic Government. At that time, the Huaxian party organization of the CCP was under the leadership of the Hebei, Shandong and Henan Prefectural Committees of the CCP. In the early days of the Anti-Japanese War, the Huaxian party organization of the CCP was mainly active in Dazhai, Sangcun, and Laomiao in Dongxiang. Liang Boqi followed the organization to mobilize women in this area to join the Anti Japanese. During this period, Liang Boqi and Zhao Ziyang, who was the secretary of the CPC Huaxian County Committee and was soon promoted to the secretary of the CPC Hebei, Shandong and Henan prefectural committees, had been working as superiors and subordinates at work. The two discovered that each other had studied in Kaifeng and Wuhan during their chats, but do not know each other. The shared experience brought them closer together.

At that time, the Hebei, Shandong and Henan Prefectural Committees of the Communist Party of China were often stationed in the eastern part of Hua County, so when Liang Boqi organized anti-Japanese training classes for women activists in Zhaozhuang Village of Sang Village (also Zhao Ziyang’s hometown), he invited the prefectural party secretary Zhao Ziyang to come ome and teach. Liang Boqi is good at connecting with the masses. She met two godmothers and a godmother in the resident village. Liang Boqi loved to sing, and often organized women in the resident village to learn to sing anti-Japanese songs, such as "March of the Big Swords", "Yellow River Cantata" and so on. Liang Boqi had a very good voice, and the Huaxian county and district committee members of the Communist Party of China, who are co-resident in the old district in the eastern part of Huaxian County, liked her very much. Although Zhao Ziyang, secretary of the prefectural party committee, also liked her very much, but the war was cruel at that time, and he didn't care about developing a romantic relationship. Only a few months later, the Japanese army carried out the inhumane "Five-Five Raids" targeting the eastern part of Huaxian County and the base area in the sandy area. They burned, killed, and robbed all. Under the rule of the Japanese army, the people were forced to organize maintenance meetings, and village-to-village, household-to-household joint guarantees were carried out. The Japanese army and the puppet army built strongholds in the area to forcefully suppress anti-Japanese activists.

In 2019, her remains were interred along with the remains of her husband in a cemetery about 60 kilometers outside Beijing.

References 

2013 deaths
1918 births
People from Anyang